Sirens is a Canadian-American crime drama series that aired on ABC in 1993, and then in syndication from 1994 to 1995. The show was filmed in Montreal, Quebec, Canada, standing in for Pittsburgh, Pennsylvania, where the show is set.

Synopsis
Sirens focused on the work and lives of three rookie female Pittsburgh Police officers. Officer Sarah Berkezchuk (Jayne Brook) is dealing with her failing marriage, Officer Lynn Stanton (Adrienne-Joi Johnson) is a single mom, and second-generation cop Officer Molly Whelan (Liza Snyder) has a bad attitude which starts to interfere with her job. Each rookie officer worked under a veteran cop, and each grows and becomes more focused as a result. A few episodes into the syndicated series Molly Whelan is taken under the wing of Detective Lt. Lyle Springer (J. H. Wyman) and slowly learns the ropes of detective work, and becomes a stand-up policewoman.

Despite receiving an Emmy nomination, the series was canceled by ABC after 13 episodes, but was picked up in syndication the following year, with 22 episodes being produced and aired. Sirens syndicated run featured a slightly different cast, with Adrienne-Joi Johnson and Liza Snyder reprising their lead roles, and Jayne Heitmeyer replacing Jayne Brook, but was still set in Pittsburgh.

This TV formula, while not a success with Sirens, was somewhat retooled into 2010's Rookie Blue, which like Sirens was predominantly filmed in Canada.

Characters
 Officer Sarah Berkezchuk (Jayne Brook, season 1)
 Officer Lynn Stanton (Adrienne-Joi Johnson)
 Officer Molly Whelan (Liza Snyder)
 Heidi Schiller (Deirdre O'Connell, season 1)
 Dan Kelly (John Terlesky, season 1; Claude Genest, season 2)
 Robert (Anthony Salador, season 1)
 Lieutenant Lyle Springer (Robert Rothman, season 1; Joel Wyner, season 2)
 James 'Buddy' Zunder (Tim Thomerson)
 Cary Berkezchuk (John Speredakos, season 1)
 Jessie Jaworski (Jayne Heitmeyer; season 2)
 Amy Shapiro (Ellen David, season 2)
 Ritchie Stiles (Christopher Judge, season 2)

Episodes

Series overview

Season 1 (1993)

Season 2 (1994–95)

Awards and nominations

References

External links
 
 

1990s American crime drama television series
1993 American television series debuts
1993 American television series endings
1994 American television series debuts
1995 American television series endings
American Broadcasting Company original programming
English-language television shows
First-run syndicated television programs in the United States
Television shows set in Pittsburgh
Television shows filmed in Montreal
Fictional portrayals of the Pittsburgh Bureau of Police
American television series revived after cancellation